Network Q RAC Rally Championship is a rally computer game that is part of the Rally Championship series and a sequel to Network Q RAC Rally (1993). The game was released for MS-DOS in 1996. It was developed by British studio Magnetic Fields and published by Europress. An expansion pack, The X-Miles, was released in 1997. It added 10 new tracks and an arcade mode. A sequel was also released in 1997, called International Rally Championship.

Reception

GameSpot concluded that "whether you're looking for unadulterated arcade action or a serious simulation, Rally Championship delivers the goods. Give it smoother road graphics, visual car damage, and enhanced multiplayer support, and Rally Championship will be set to challenge the very best the PC racing world has to offer".

References

External links

Demo version at Internet Archive

1996 video games
DOS games
DOS-only games
Magnetic Fields (video game developer) games
Multiplayer and single-player video games
Rally racing video games
Video games developed in the United Kingdom
Video games with expansion packs